Adrienne Southworth is an American politician from Kentucky. She is a Republican and represents District 7 in the State Senate.

After Donald Trump lost the 2020 election and refused to concede, Southworth promoted falsehoods and conspiracy theories about election fraud, including an unsubstantiated claim that all presidential elections since Ronald Reagan’s victory in 1980, with the exception of Trump’s victory in 2016, have been rigged.

In February 2021 Southworth filed Senate Bill 158 as its sole sponsor, looking to ban the mandate of face mask requirements during a state of emergency amidst the COVID-19 pandemic in Kentucky. She has also spoken out against compulsory vaccinations, and in 2021 proposed an amendment to Senate Bill 2 that would prohibit health facilities from requiring employees to receive a COVID-19 vaccine.

References

External links

 Official website

Living people
Republican Party Kentucky state senators
21st-century American politicians
21st-century American women politicians
Women state legislators in Kentucky
Louisiana Baptist University alumni
Year of birth missing (living people)